Chernyshyov or Chernyshev is a Russian masculine surname, its feminine counterpart is Chernyshyova or Chernysheva. Notable people with the surname include:

Arkady Chernyshev (1914–1992), Soviet ice hockey  and association football player
Alexander Chernyshyov (1786–1857), military leader of 1812 guerrilla warfare, diplomat and statesman (Russian Minister of War, 1827–1856)
Aleksandr Chernyshyov (1882–1940), Russian electrical engineer
Alexey Chernyshyov (born 1939), governor of Orenburg Oblast, Russia
Avdotya Chernysheva (1693–1747), Russian noble and lady in waiting
Dmitry Chernyshyov (born 1975), Russian swimmer
Evgenia Chernyshyova, Russian figure skater
Feodosy Chernyshyov (1856–1914), Russian geologist and paleontologist
Ivan Chernyshyov (1726–1797), Russian field marshal
Lyudmila Chernyshyova (born 1952), Russian volleyball player
Nadezhda Chernyshyova (born 1951), Russian rower
Natalya Golitsyna, née Chernyshyova (1741-1838), lady-in-waiting, socialite and noble 
Oleg Chernyshov(born 1986), Russian football player
Olga Chernysheva (born 1962), Russian artist
Piotr Grigoryevich Chernyshev (1712-1773), diplomat, statesman
Svetlana Chernyshyova (born 1984), Russian figure skater
Vladimir Chernyshyov (1951–2004), Russian volleyball player
Countess Xenia Czernichev-Besobrasov (1929–1968), Austrian princess
 Yevgeni Chernyshyev (born 1947), Soviet handball player
Zakhar Chernyshyov (1722–1784), Russian Minister of War

See also
Chernyshov, a similar surname
Chernyshev (rural locality), a rural locality (khutor) in Shovgenovsky District of the Republic of Adygea, Russia
Lomonosov Bridge, formerly Chernyshyov Bridge, a bridge across the Fontanka River in St. Petersburg, Russia
Chernyshev (crater), a lunar crater

Russian-language surnames